Dennis Law Sau-yiu (born 19 February 1963) is a Hong Kong film producer, screenwriter, actor,  director and presenter. He is the former chairman and executive director of Milkyway Image, and a founder of its subsidiary company Point of View Movie Production Co. Ltd.  Films directed by Law include teen comedies such as The Unusual Youth and Love @ First Note, and martial arts action films that include Fatal Contact and Fatal Move.

Early life
Law studied filmmaking at university in Los Angeles. He holds a Bachelor of Arts Degree in Communications from Loyola Marymount University.

Career
On his return to Hong Kong, rather than pursue his career in film, Law decided to go into real estate. He later befriended Charles Heung, who advised him to learn from veteran filmmakers such as Herman Yau. In 2003, Law befriended prolific filmmaker Johnnie To and became his financial partner at Milkyway Image, serving as a chairman and executive director. Law had many opportunities to travel to the world's film markets and festivals, meet film industry personnel from different parts of the globe, find out their views of Hong Kong cinema, as well as seeing To on set as a director. Apart from filmmaking, Law is currently a managing director of the Yu Tai Hing Company Ltd., which is a well-established private property investment and development group in Hong Kong.

Point of View Movie Production Co. Ltd.
Apart from producing Election with To in 2005, along with its 2006 sequel, Law formed his own production company, Point of View Movie Production Co. Ltd. (影視點制作有限公司), a subsidiary of Milkyway Image. Point of View was one of two companies established by Law after Milkyway Image split from its parent company, Brilliant Arts. Since its establishment, Point of View has notably been a frequent production partner for Charles Heung's company China Star Entertainment Group, producing films in which Law has served as a producer and director.

Films
Law made his directorial debut with the 2005 teen comedy-drama The Unusual Youth. Law's next two films saw the director collaborating with entertainers managed by Gold Label Records.  He wrote, produced and directed the teen comedy, Love @ First Note, which starred Justin Lo, Kary Ng, Stephy Tang and Miki Yeung.  He later made the martial arts romance film Fatal Contact, hoping to establish his lead actor Wu Jing as a martial arts icon. His next film was the 2008 film Fatal Move, which was originally his idea for a sequel to SPL: Sha Po Lang. The film featured an ensemble cast that included SPL stars Sammo Hung, Wu Jing and Simon Yam, and marked the return of veteran Hong Kong actor Danny Lee who once again plays a just policeman in the film.  Of the casting, Law wanted to cast a series of familiar Hong Kong actors as the film was aimed at a foreign market.

Upon its release, Fatal Move was awarded a Category III rating in Hong Kong for its extreme violence.  His next film was A Very Short Life, a film about child abuse and molestation. The film was also awarded with a Category III rating for its subject matter.

Trademarks
Law uses the same production crew for all of his films as well as having an ensemble cast of popular Chinese actors. Law also uses computer-generated imagery to create blood, as seen in films such as A Very Short Life and Fatal Move.

Recurring actors

Filmography

References

External links
 
Asia Pacific Arts, 11 May 2007: "News From Abroad"

1963 births
Hong Kong male film actors
Hong Kong film directors
Hong Kong film presenters
Hong Kong film producers
Hong Kong screenwriters
Living people
Loyola Marymount University alumni